A Web Map Tile Service (WMTS) is a standard protocol for serving pre-rendered or run-time computed georeferenced map tiles over the Internet. The specification was developed and first published by the Open Geospatial Consortium in 2010.

History
The Open Geospatial Consortium (OGC) became involved in developing standards for web mapping after a paper was published in 1997 by Allan Doyle, outlining a "WWW Mapping Framework". The oldest and most popular standard for web mapping is WMS. However, the properties of this standard proved to be difficult to implement for situations where short response times were important. For most WMS services it is not uncommon to require 1 or more CPU seconds to produce a response. For massive parallel use cases, such a CPU-intensive service is not practical. To overcome the CPU intensive on-the-fly rendering problem, application developers started using pre-rendered map tiles. Several open and proprietary schemes were invented to organize and address these map tiles. An earlier specification for this is the Tile Map Service (TMS). It is simpler than WMTS. It was developed by members of the OSGeo and is not backed by an official standards body.

Requests
WMTS specifies a number of request encodings:
 KVP key-value-pairs encoding (over HTTP)
 REST Representational state transfer encoding (over HTTP)
 SOAP Simple Object Access Protocol encoding (usually over HTTP)

The syntax for the WMTS request types is different for each of these encodings. Some request types are:
 Capabilities returns information about the WMTS service parameters
 Tile returns a map tile
 FeatureInfo returns (alphanumeric) information for a given map location
 Legend returns a legend image for the map

See also
 Open Source Geospatial Foundation (OSGeo)
 Tile Map Service (TMS)
 Tiled web map
 Web Coverage Service (WCS)
 Web Feature Service (WFS)
 Web Map Service (WMS)

References

External links
 OGC WMTS

GIS software
Web Geographic information systems
Open Geospatial Consortium